= Nhon Hoi (disambiguation) =

Nhơn Hội is a rural commune (xã) and village of An Giang Province.

Nhon Hoi may also refer to:

- Nhơn Hội, a former commune of Qui Nhơn in Bình Định Province
